87th NBR Awards
Best Film: 
Mad Max: Fury Road

The 87th National Board of Review Awards, honoring the best in film for 2015, were announced on December 1, 2015.

Top 10 Films
Films listed alphabetically except top, which is ranked as Best Film of the Year:

Mad Max: Fury Road
Bridge of Spies
Creed
The Hateful Eight
Inside Out
The Martian
Room
Sicario
Spotlight
Straight Outta Compton

Top Foreign Films
Goodnight Mommy
Mediterranea
Phoenix
The Second Mother
The Tribe

Top Documentaries 
Best of Enemies
The Black Panthers: Vanguard of the Revolution
The Diplomat
Listen to Me Marlon
The Look of Silence

Top Independent Films 
'71
45 Years
Cop Car
Ex Machina
Grandma
It Follows
James White
Mississippi Grind
Welcome to Me
While We’re Young

Winners

Best Film:
Mad Max: Fury Road

Best Director:
Ridley Scott, The Martian

Best Actor:
Matt Damon, The Martian

Best Actress:
Brie Larson, Room

Best Supporting Actor:
Sylvester Stallone, Creed

Best Supporting Actress:
Jennifer Jason Leigh, The Hateful Eight

Best Original Screenplay:
Quentin Tarantino, The Hateful Eight

Best Adapted Screenplay:
Drew Goddard, The Martian

Best Animated Feature:
Inside Out

Breakthrough Performance (TIE):
Abraham Attah, Beasts of No Nation
Jacob Tremblay, Room

Best Directorial Debut:
Jonas Carpignano, Mediterranea

Best Foreign Language Film:
Son of Saul

Best Documentary:
Amy

William K. Everson Film History Award:
Cecilia De Mille Presley

Best Ensemble:
The Big Short

Spotlight Award:
Sicario, for Outstanding Collaborative Vision.

NBR Freedom of Expression:
Beasts of No Nation
Mustang

References

National Board of Review Awards
2015 film awards
2015 in American cinema